Uruguay participated in the 2015 Parapan American Games.

Competitors
The following table lists Uruguay's delegation per sport and gender.

Medalists
The following competitors from Uruguay won medals at the games. In the by discipline sections below, medalists' names are bolded.

|align="left" valign="top"|

|align="left" valign="top"|

|align="left" valign="top"|

Football 5-a-side

Uruguay will send a team of eight athletes to compete.

Pablo Bertoche
Anthony Da Luz Gonzalez
Jonathan Delgado Martinez
Mauro Diaz Canaveris
Gonzalo Lapachian
Santiago Lopez Garcia
Paulo Muino
Gustavo Sanabria Trias
Marcelo Silva Irisarri
Arel Sirin

Preliminary Round

Judo

Uruguay sent a male athlete to compete.

Swimming

Uruguay sent a male swimmer to compete.

See also
Uruguay at the 2016 Summer Paralympics
Uruguay at the 2015 Pan American Games

References

2015 in Uruguayan sport
Nations at the 2015 Parapan American Games
Uruguay at the Pan American Games